Diana Iuliana Mocanu (born 19 July 1984 in Brăila) is a Romanian former Olympic and national record holding swimmer. She swam at the 2000 Olympics, where she won in the 100 and 200 backstrokes, both in Romanian records. She also won in the 200 meter backstroke at the 2001 World Aquatics Championships.

In 2015, she was inducted into the International Swimming Hall of Fame.

References

External links 
 FINA biography

1984 births
Living people
Sportspeople from Brăila
Romanian female backstroke swimmers
Olympic swimmers of Romania
Swimmers at the 2000 Summer Olympics
Olympic gold medalists for Romania
Female butterfly swimmers
World Aquatics Championships medalists in swimming
European Aquatics Championships medalists in swimming

Medalists at the 2000 Summer Olympics
Olympic gold medalists in swimming